Birralee may refer to:
Birralee, Belair, a mansion in Belair, South Australia
Birralee, Glenelg, a mansion in Glenelg, South Australia
Birralee International School Trondheim, Norway
Birralee, Tasmania, a locality in the Meander Valley Council
Bride at Birralee, a novel by Marion Lennox
Brisbane Birralee Voices, a children's community choir
Repatriation Hospital "Birralee", a subsequent use of Birralee, Belair